The  was a light machine gun used by the Imperial Japanese Army in the interwar period and during World War II.

History

Combat experience in the Russo-Japanese War of 1904–1905 had convinced the Japanese of the utility of machine guns in providing covering fire for advancing infantry. This was reinforced by first-hand observations of European combat tactics by Japanese military attachés during the First World War, and the Army Technical Bureau was tasked with the development of a lightweight machine gun which could be easily transported by an infantry squad. The resultant "Type 11 light machine gun" (named after the 11th year of the reign of Emperor Taishō, or 1922) was the first light machine gun to be mass-produced in Japan and the oldest Japanese light machine gun design to see service in the Pacific War. It was superseded by the Type 96 light machine gun in 1936.

Design details

The Type 11 light machine gun was a design by famed arms designer Kijirō Nambu, based on a modification of the French Hotchkiss M1909 Benét–Mercié machine gun. It was an air-cooled, gas-operated design, using the same 6.5×50mm Arisaka cartridges as the Type 38 infantry rifle.

A feature of the Type 11 machine gun is its detachable hopper; it can be refilled while attached and does not require removal during operation. Instead of a belt or box magazine, the Type 11 was designed to hold up to six of the same cartridge clips used on the Type 38 rifle. The five-round clips were stacked lying flat above the receiver, secured by a spring arm, and the rounds were stripped from the lowest clip one at a time, with the empty clip thrown clear and the next clip automatically falling into place as the gun was fired. The system had the advantage that any squad member could supply ammunition and that the hopper could be replenished at any time. The relatively short barrel (17.5 inches) produced excessive flash with standard ammunition (initially intended for Type 38 rifles with barrels more than a foot longer). A new load was introduced which burned much more completely in the Type 11's short barrel and produced much less flash as a result. This new round was called the 6.5×50mm Arisaka genso round and the ammunition cartons were identified by a circled "G".

The inherent disadvantage of the hopper was that the open feeder box allowed dust and grit to enter the gun, which was liable to jam in muddy or dirty conditions due to issues with poor dimensional tolerances, which gave the weapon a bad reputation with Japanese troops. Another issue was that the weight of the rifle cartridges in the side-mounted hopper unbalanced the weapon when fully loaded. To compensate, the buttstock was designed in a way that it bent to the right, leading to the Chinese nickname for the weapon "bent buttstock". Reloading the weapon during an assault charge proved impossible due to the clip feeding system.

Variants
Type 89 "flexible" – Two Type 11 actions mounted on a flexible mounting for anti-aircraft use and as a rear-defense aerial gun. The machine gun was chambered for the 7.7x58mmSR Type 89 cartridge. It was equipped with a metallic Y-shaped stock and two spade grips, the barrels had no cooling fins. It was fed from two 45-round quadrant-shaped pan magazines (each magazine had a place for nine five-round stripper clips). The double-barrelled machine gun weighted about 28 kg and had a rate of fire of around 1,400 rpm.

Type 91 – was a modified Type 11 for use on tanks and armoured vehicles. The machine gun was equipped with an angled pistol grip, the stock and bipod were removed. Additionally, the machine gun was equipped with two brackets (on the right side) for mounting a 1.5x30 scope manufactured by Tomioka Kogaku.

Te-4 – A modified Type 11 which was designed to replace the Type 89 "flexible" due to the excessive weight of the latter. It used a different flexible mounting, had a shorter wooden stock and a straight pistol grip with an enlarged trigger guard, the barrel had no cooling fins. It was chambered for the 7.7x58mmSR Type 89 cartridge and fed from 70-round pan magazines. It is uncertain whether the Te-4 was made by splitting the Type 89 "flexible" or was a direct derivative of Type 11.

Liao Type 17 - A copy of the Type 11 design manufactured in small numbers at the Mukden Arsenal.

Combat record

The Type 11 came into active service in 1922, and some 29,000 were produced by the time production stopped in 1941. It was the primary Japanese light machine gun through the Manchurian Incident and in the early stages of the Second Sino-Japanese War. Although superseded by the Type 96 light machine gun in production in 1936, it remained in service with front-line combat through the end of World War II. Many were captured by the Chinese and were used against the Japanese. The Manchukuo Imperial Army replaced its ex-Chinese ZB vz. 30s with Type 11s in 1936. Both sides also used Type 11 machine guns during the Chinese Civil War and North Korea used Type 11 and Type 91 during the Korean War. The Viet Minh also used the Type 11 during the First Indochina War, as did the Viet Cong during the Vietnam War.

Users
  Republic of China: Purchased a small number before war with Japan began. Later captured Japanese examples were used by all Chinese armies including Nationalist, Warlord, Collaborationist and Communist. 

  People's Liberation Army
: Captured from Japanese army
  Viet Cong
  Viet Minh

Notes

References

External links

dragonsoffire.com 
Taki’s Imperial Japanese Army page
US Technical Manual E 30–480

Light machine guns
11
11
World War II machine guns
Machine guns of Manchukuo
Military equipment introduced in the 1920s